A Collège de droit ('College of law') in France is a selective training inside a faculty of law for top students selected among the French student body. Students from these programs are much more likely to enter prestigious master's degrees or law firms.

History
In France, originally, universities were not allowed to choose which students are allowed to their undergraduate degree. Panthéon-Assas University created then in 2008 a special school for selecting its best students. Several universities rapidly followed this model It permitted to French universities to select students despite the legal global prohibition.

Media soon called these schools "ways of excellence" inside each university for "brilliant students" or "grandes écoles inside universities"

Collèges de droit have been criticised by some left-wing students' union, including UNEF, because universities should not make merit-based distinctions according to them.

Existing Law colleges in France

Since 2008: Collège de droit and École de droit de Paris from Paris 2 Panthéon-Assas University

Panthéon-Assas University created in 2008 a special school for selecting its best students in first year in order to give them special courses and a special degree: the College of Law. In 2011, the Paris Law School was created when the first class of the College of Law had its degree. To be admitted, you have to obtain "Summa Cum Laude" in Baccalauréat and pass an entrance test. Each class is composed of around 100 students, now selected among the whole France each year.

Assas or Paris Law School (École de droit), is a school from Panthéon-Assas University delivering a graduate degree, after the College of Law (Collège de droit) delivering an undergraduate degree. The Collège de droit was the first college of law created by a French University in 2008. An additional year abroad is mandatory to obtain the Assas Law School degree.

Panthéon-Assas University being considered as the top faculty of law in France, media focused particularly on it and called even more this law college and school "way of excellence"

Since 2009: Grande école du droit from University of Paris-Sud
Created by University of Paris-Sud in 2009 is a four-year program leading to a master's degree in commercial law. It is designed to allow students to distinguish themselves in the field of law.

Since 2009: Collège de droit de Montpellier

Created by University of Montpellier in 2009, two-year degree very much focused on the classical study of law, particularly through the ancient languages. Their motto is a quote from Seneca.

Since 2010: Collège supérieur de droit de Toulouse

Created by Toulouse 1 University Capitole in 2010, two-year degree which prepares students for a high level of law studies.

Since 2010: Collège de droit from University of La Réunion
Created by University of La Réunion in 2010, two-year degree which emphasizes language learning, especially English.

Since 2010: Collège de droit de Lyon

Created by Jean Moulin University Lyon 3 in 2010, three-year degree which primarily promotes contact between undergraduates for their network. 

The "Association du Collège de droit de l'Université Jean Moulin Lyon III" was created in 2014 to create cohesion between the students of the Collège de droit.

Since 2011: Académie de droit d’Aix-Marseille

Created by Aix-Marseille University in 2011, it is a four-year degree, exchange experience included, where courses cover both law and political science.

Since 2012: Parcours d’excellence en droit of Paris Descartes University 
Created by Paris Descartes University in 2012, two-year degree but only from the second year onwards.

Since 2016: Parcours d’excellence en droit of Rennes I University 

Created by University of Rennes 1 in 2016, three-year degree.

Since 2017: Collège de Droit de la Sorbonne

Created by University of Paris 1 Pantheon-Sorbonne in 2017, three-year degree, delivers the interuniversitaire "Collège de Droit de la Sorbonne" in addition to the law undergraduate's degree.

With this diploma, Paris 1 aims to focus on excellence and on a multidisciplinary approach to law, with philosophy, history, international law, sociology, finance or economy teaching, and to train lawyers able to go beyond a pure legal perspective, while deepening the learning of law.

Applicants wishing to join the diploma in first year are selected following a process based on the excellence of their academic records and an oral exam. Paris 1 claims to want "brilliant students with a high level of general knowledge and a solid capacity for work".

References

External links
Website of each law school or college
Collège de Droit de la Sorbonne
Collège de droit de Montpellier
Collège de droit de Lyon
École de droit de Paris
Académie de droit d'Aix-Marseille (ADAM)
Grande école du droit (Paris-Sud)
Collège supérieur de droit de Toulouse
Collège de droit (La Réunion)
Paris-Descartes - Parcours d’excellence en droit
Rennes I - Parcours d’excellence en droit
Websites of student associations

Law schools in France
Universities in France
France